"Creep" is the debut single by the English rock band Radiohead, released on 21 September 1992. It appeared on their debut studio album, Pablo Honey (1993). Radiohead took elements from the 1972 song "The Air That I Breathe"; following legal action, Albert Hammond and Mike Hazlewood are credited as cowriters.

Radiohead had not planned to release "Creep", and recorded it at the suggestion of the producers, Sean Slade and Paul Q. Kolderie, while they were working on other songs. Kolderie convinced their record label, EMI, to release "Creep" as a single. It was not initially a success, but achieved radio play in Israel and became popular on American alternative rock radio. It was reissued in 1993 and became a worldwide hit, likened to alt-rock "slacker anthems" such as ''Smells Like Teen Spirit'' by Nirvana and ''Loser" by Beck.

Reviews of "Creep" were mostly positive. EMI pressured Radiohead to match its success, which created tension during the recording of their second album, The Bends (1995). "Creep" is atypical of Radiohead's later work; the band grew weary of it, feeling it set narrow expectations of their music, and did not perform it for several years. Though they achieved greater commercial and critical success with later albums, "Creep" remains Radiohead's most successful single. It was named one of the greatest debut singles and one of the greatest songs by Rolling Stone. In 2021, Yorke released a remixed version with synthesisers and time-stretched acoustic guitar.

Recording 
Radiohead formed in Oxforshire in 1985 and signed a record contract with EMI in 1991. They released their debut, the Drill EP, in 1992, which drew little attention. For their debut single, Radiohead hired the American producers Sean Slade and Paul Q. Kolderie and recorded at Chipping Norton Recording Studios in Chipping Norton, Oxfordshire. They worked on the songs "Inside My Head" and "Lurgee", but without results.

Between rehearsals, Radiohead spontaneously performed another song, "Creep", which the singer, Thom Yorke, had written at Exeter University in the late 1980s. Yorke jokingly described it as their "Scott Walker song", which Slade and Kolderie misinterpreted. As they left the studio that night, Slade told Kolderie, "Too bad their best song's a cover."

After further recording sessions failed to produce results, Kolderie suggested Radiohead record "Creep". Radiohead performed it one take, after which everyone in the studio burst into applause. After Radiohead assured Kolderie that "Creep" was an original song, he called EMI and convinced them to release it as the single. According to Kolderie, "Everyone [at EMI] who heard Creep just started going insane." Slade and Kolderie suggested that the lead guitarist, Jonny Greenwood, add piano. During the final mix, Kolderie forgot to add the piano until the outro; however, the band approved of the result.

Radiohead also recorded a censored version for radio, which replaces the line "so fucking special" with "so very special". Radiohead worried that issuing a censored version would be selling out, but decided it was acceptable since their idols Sonic Youth had done the same thing; nonetheless, Greenwood said the British press "weren't impressed". During the recording session for the censored lyrics, Kolderie convinced Yorke to rewrite the first verse, saying he thought Yorke could do better.

Lyrics 
Greenwood said the lyrics were inspired by a girl that Yorke had followed around and who unexpectedly attended a Radiohead performance. John Harris, then the Oxford correspondent for Melody Maker, said "Creep" was about a girl who frequented the upmarket Little Clarendon Street in Oxford. According to Harris, Yorke preferred the more bohemian Jericho, and expressed his discomfort with the lines "What the hell am I doing here / I don't belong here".

Asked about "Creep" in 1993, Yorke said: "I have a real problem being a man in the '90s... Any man with any sensitivity or conscience toward the opposite sex would have a problem. To actually assert yourself in a masculine way without looking like you're in a hard-rock band is a very difficult thing to do... It comes back to the music we write, which is not effeminate, but it's not brutal in its arrogance. It is one of the things I'm always trying: to assert a sexual persona and on the other hand trying desperately to negate it." Greenwood said "Creep" was in fact a happy song about "recognising what you are". Yorke said he was not happy with the lyrics, and "thought they were pretty crap".

Composition 

The G–B–C–Cm chord progression is repeated throughout the song, only alternating between arpeggiated chords in the verses and last chorus and loud power chords during the first two choruses. In G major, these may be interpreted as "I–V7/vi–IV–iv". According to Guy Capuzzo, the ostinato musically portrays "the song's obsessive lyrics, which depict the 'self-lacerating rage of an unsuccessful crush'." For example, the "highest pitches of the ostinato form a prominent chromatic line that 'creeps' up, then down, involving scale degrees – – – ....[while] ascend[ing], the lyrics strain towards optimism... Descend[ing], the subject sinks back into the throes of self-pity ... The guitarist's fretting hand mirrors this contour."

The middle eight originally featured a guitar solo from Greenwood. When the guitarist Ed O'Brien pointed out that the chord progression was the same as the 1972 song "The Air That I Breathe", Yorke wrote a new middle eight using the same vocal melody. According to Greenwood, "It was funny to us in a way, sort of feeding something like that into [it]. It's a bit of change."

When the song shifts from the verse to the chorus, Jonny Greenwood plays three blasts of guitar noise ("dead notes" played by releasing fret-hand pressure and picking the strings). Greenwood said he did this because he did not like how quiet the song was; he explained: "So I hit the guitar hard—really hard." O'Brien said: "That's the sound of Jonny trying to fuck the song up. He really didn't like it the first time we played it, so he tried spoiling it. And it made the song." According to the Guardian critic Alexis Petridis, "Creep" has an "almost complete lack of resemblance" to Radiohead's later music.

Music video 
The "Creep" music video was filmed at the Venue, Oxford. For the video, Radiohead performed a free short concert, playing "Creep" several times. They donated proceeds from audience members to the Oxford magazine Curfew, which had covered their early work. In the audience was the electronic musician Four Tet, then a teenager, who years later supported Radiohead on tour and collaborated with Yorke.

Release 

EMI released "Creep" as a single on 21 September 1992, when it reached number 78 on the UK Singles Chart, selling 6,000 copies. BBC Radio 1 found it "too depressing" and excluded it from playlists. Radiohead's follow-up singles "Anyone Can Play Guitar" and "Pop Is Dead" were unsuccessful. "Creep" was included on Radiohead's debut album, Pablo Honey, released on 22 February 1993. 

In late 1992, the Israeli DJ Yoav Kutner played "Creep" often on Israeli radio, having been introduced to it by an EMI representative, and it became a national hit. Radiohead quickly set up tour dates in Israel to capitalise on the success. "Creep" had similar success in New Zealand, Spain, and Scandinavia. In the US, "Creep" became an underground hit in California after it was added to an alternative rock radio playlist in San Francisco. A censored version was released to radio stations. By mid-1993, "Creep" had become an alt-rock hit in America, a "slacker anthem" in the vein of ''Smells Like Teen Spirit'' by Nirvana and ''Loser" by Beck. Radiohead were surprised by the success; Yorke told Melody Maker in 1993 that many journalists misunderstood it, asking him if it was a joke. In September 1993, Radiohead performed "Creep" on Late Night with Conan O'Brien as the show's first musical guests.

Radiohead did not want to reissue "Creep" in the UK, but they relented following pressure from the music press, EMI and fans. The reissue was released in the UK on 6 September 1993 and reached number seven. It was bolstered by a Top of the Pops performance in September, which drew criticism from music journalists and artists including the Oasis guitarist Noel Gallagher. In the US, "Creep" was aided by its appearance in a 1994 episode of the MTV animated series Beavis and Butt-Head; Capitol, Radiohead's US label, used the endorsement in a marketing campaign with the slogan "Beavis and Butt-Head say [Radiohead] don't suck". An acoustic version of "Creep", taken from a live performance on KROQ-FM on 13 July 1993, was included on Radiohead's 1994 EP My Iron Lung.

In June 2008, "Creep" re-entered the UK Singles Chart at number 37 after its inclusion on Radiohead: The Best Of. As of April 2019, in the UK, it was the most streamed song released in 1992, with 10.1 million streams. It remains Radiohead's most successful single.

Critical reception 
Reviewing the 1993 reissue, Larry Flick of Billboard wrote: "Minimal cut, boosted with just a touch of noise, relies mainly on an appropriately languid, melodic vocal (which also vaults into Bono-esque falsetto range) to pull the whole thing together. A possible spinner for alternative and college radio." Troy J. Augusto from Cashbox described it as a song "for all those of the post-pimple set who just can't find their way in this big ol' world. Vocalist Thom Yorke is our too-self-aware hero who won't let a little disillusionment keep him down. Song's hook is the razor-sharp guitar play that frames Yorke's gnashing of teeth." Marisa Fox of Entertainment Weekly wrote that "Creep" was "the ultimate neurotic teen anthem", marrying the self-consciousness of the Smiths, the vocals and guitar of U2, and the "heavy but crunchy pop" of the Cure. 

Sharon O'Connell from Melody Maker viewed it as "a stormer, a perfect monster of a malevolent pop son that kicks in with a minimal, dismal shuffle and laconic whisper". She added, "Curiously, this makes Radiohead seem like some bunch of semi-industrial mates to Suede. It's the same self-awareness and suss that does it, the same brashness simply wielding different tools, and, like all the best pop, it gently strokes the nape of your neck before it digs the bread knife in. Agression is rarely this delicious." Martin Aston from Music Week gave it four out of five, describing it as "stunning". Tom Doyle from Smash Hits also gave it four out of five and named it Best New Single, praising Yorke's lyrics, the "crunching guitar" and the "delirious" chorus. A reviewer from People called it a "startling pop song" and a "gripping descent into love's dark regrets".

Legacy 

Following the release of Pablo Honey, Radiohead spent two years touring in support of Belly, PJ Harvey and James. They performed "Creep" at every show, and came to resent it. O'Brien recalled: "We seemed to be living out the same four and a half minutes of our lives over and over again. It was incredibly stultifying." Yorke told Rolling Stone in 1993: "It's like it's not our song any more ... It feels like we're doing a cover." During Radiohead's first American tour, audience members would scream for "Creep", then leave after it was performed. Yorke said the success "gagged" them and had almost caused them to break up; they felt they were being judged on a single song. Radiohead were determined to move on rather than "repeat that small moment of [our] lives forevermore".

According to O'Brien, the success of "Creep" meant that Radiohead were not in debt to EMI, and so had more freedom on their next album, The Bends (1995). The album title, a term for decompression sickness, references Radiohead's rapid rise to fame with "Creep"; Yorke said "we just came up too fast". John Leckie, who produced The Bends, recalled that EMI hoped for a single "even better" than "Creep" but that Radiohead "didn't even know what was good about it in the first place". Radiohead wrote the Bends track "My Iron Lung" in response, with the lines: "This is our new song / just like the last one / a total waste of time". Yorke said in 1995: "People have defined our emotional range with that one song, 'Creep'. I saw reviews of 'My Iron Lung' that said it was just like 'Creep'. When you're up against things like that, it's like: 'Fuck you.' These people are never going to listen."

In January 1996, Radiohead surpassed the UK chart performance of "Creep" with the Bends single "Street Spirit", which reached number five. This, alongside the critical success of The Bends, established that Radiohead were not one-hit wonders. Over the following years, Radiohead departed further from the style of "Creep". During the promotion for their third album, OK Computer (1997), Yorke became hostile when "Creep" was mentioned in interviews and refused requests to play it, telling a Montréal audience: "Fuck off, we're tired of it." He dismissed fans demanding it as "anally retarded". After the tour, Radiohead did not perform "Creep" until the encore of their 2001 homecoming concert at South Park, Oxford, when an equipment failure halted a performance of another song.

In a surprise move, Radiohead performed "Creep" as the opening song of their headline performance at the 2009 Reading Festival. They did not perform it again until their 2016 tour for A Moon Shaped Pool, when a fan spent the majority of a concert shouting for it. Radiohead decided to play it to "see what the reaction is, just to see how it feels". They performed "Creep" again during the encore of their headline performance at the Glastonbury Festival that year. According to the Guardian critic Alexis Petridis, "Given Radiohead’s famously fractious relationship with their first big hit ... the performance of 'Creep' [was] greeted with something approaching astonished delight." In 2017, O'Brien said: "It's nice to play for the right reasons. People like it and want to hear it. We do err towards not playing it because you don't want it to feel like show business." In the same interview, Yorke said: "It can be cool sometimes, but other times I want to stop halfway through and be like, 'Nah, this isn't happening'." In a 2020 interview, O'Brien was dismissive of Pablo Honey but cited "Creep" as the "standout track".

According to the journalist Alex Ross in 2001, "What set 'Creep' apart from the grunge of the early nineties was the grandeur of its chords—in particular, its regal turn from G major to B major. No matter how many times you hear the song, the second chord still sails beautifully out of the blue. The lyrics may be saying, 'I'm a creep,' but the music is saying, 'I am majestic.'" Stephen Thomas Erlewine wrote in 2001 that "Creep" achieved "a rare power that is both visceral and intelligent". In 2007, VH1 ranked "Creep" the 31st-greatest song of the 1990s. In 2020, Rolling Stone named it the 16th-greatest debut single; the journalist Andy Greene noted that though Radiohead had followed "Creep" with "some of the most innovative and acclaimed music of the past 30 years", it remained their most famous song. The Guardian named "Creep" the 34th-greatest Radiohead song in 2020, writing: "In the end, the band's disavowal of the song sent its credibility full circle. Nowadays, 'Creep' is a joke, but we're all blissfully in on it." In 2021, Rolling Stone named "Creep" the 118th greatest song of all time.

2021 remix 
In July 2021, Yorke released "Creep (Very 2021 Rmx)", a remixed version of "Creep". The remix is based on a time-stretched version of the acoustic version of "Creep", extending it to nine minutes, with "eerie" synthesisers. Yorke contributed the remix to a show by the Japanese fashion designer Jun Takahashi, who provided artwork and an animated music video. Vogue described the remix as "haunting and spare", and Classic Rock  described it as "woozy" and "discombobulating". Rolling Stone said it was a fitting track for the COVID-19 pandemic, when "a sense of time is warped and singular moments can seem both fleeting and drawn out simultaneously".

Cover versions
In April 2008, the American musician Prince covered "Creep" at the Coachella Valley Music and Arts Festival. A bootleg recording was shared online, but removed at Prince's request; after being informed of the situation in an interview, Yorke said: "Well, tell him to unblock it. It's our song." "Creep" has also been covered by artists including Frank Bennett, Postmodern Jukebox, the Pretenders, Kelly Clarkson, Tears for Fears, Arlo Parks, the Scala & Kolacny Brothers, R3hab, Mónica Naranjo, Mxmtoon Sophie Koh and Paul Gannon. The actor Jim Carrey covered the song at Arlene's Grocery.

Copyright infringement 
The chord progression and melody in "Creep" are similar to those of the 1972 song "The Air That I Breathe", written by Albert Hammond and Mike Hazlewood. After Rondor Music, the publisher of "The Air That I Breathe", took legal action, Hammond and Hazlewood received cowriting credits and a percentage of the royalties. Hammond said Radiohead were honest about having reused the composition, and so he and Hazlewood accepted only a small part of the royalties.

In January 2018, the American singer Lana Del Rey said on Twitter that Radiohead were taking legal action against her for allegedly plagiarising "Creep" on her 2017 track "Get Free", and had asked for 100% of publishing royalties instead of Del Rey's offer of 40%. She denied that "Creep" had inspired "Get Free". Radiohead's publisher, Warner Chappell Music, confirmed it was seeking songwriting credits for "all writers" of "Creep", but denied that a lawsuit had been brought or that Radiohead had demanded 100% of royalties. In March, Del Rey told an audience: "My lawsuit's over, I guess I can sing that song any time I want." The writing credits for "Get Free" were not updated on the database of the American Society of Composers, Authors, and Publishers.

Track listings
All tracks are written by Radiohead.

 UK release (CD, cassette, 12")
 Australian release (CD, cassette)
 European release (CD)
 "Creep" – 3:53
 "Lurgee" – 3:05
 "Inside My Head" – 3:07
 "Million Dollar Question" – 3:10

 US promo (CD)
 "Creep" (edit) – 4:01
 "Creep" (LP version) – 3:55

 US single (cassette)
 "Creep" – 3:53
 "Faithless, the Wonder Boy" – 4:14

 US jukebox single (7")
 "Creep" – 4:00
 "Anyone Can Play Guitar" – 3:37

 French limited edition (CD)
 "Creep" – 3:53
 "The Bends" (live) – 3:58
 "Prove Yourself" (live) – 2:28
 "Creep" (live) – 3:50

 UK reissue (CD, cassette, 7")
 Japanese release (CD)
 "Creep" (album version) – 3:58
 "Yes I Am" – 4:24
 "Blow Out" (remix) – 4:18
 "Inside My Head" (live) – 3:06

 UK limited edition (12")
 "Creep" (acoustic) – 4:19
 "You" (live) – 3:39
 "Vegetable" (live) – 3:07
 "Killer Cars" (live) – 2:17

 Dutch release and European reissue (CD)
 "Creep" (album version) – 3:58
 "Yes I Am" – 4:25
 "Inside My Head" (live) – 3:07
 "Creep" (acoustic) – 4:19

 French reissue (CD)
 "Creep" – 3:55
 "The Bends" – 3:58

Credits and personnel
Adapted from the original release liner notes, except where noted:

Radiohead
 Thom Yorke vocals
 Jonny Greenwood lead guitar, piano
 Ed O'Brien rhythm guitar
 Colin Greenwood bass guitar
 Philip Selway drums

Technical
 Sean Slade production, engineering; mixing
 Paul Q. Kolderie production, engineering; mixing

Artwork
 Icon design
 Steve Gullick photography
 Maurice Burns painting

Charts

Weekly charts

Year-end charts

Certifications

Notes

References

Bibliography

 
 
 
Randall, Mac. Exit Music: The Radiohead Story. Delta, 2000.

External links
 
 

1992 songs
1992 debut singles
Radiohead songs
Parlophone singles
Capitol Records singles
Songs written by Thom Yorke
Songs written by Jonny Greenwood
Songs written by Ed O'Brien
Songs written by Colin Greenwood
Songs written by Philip Selway
Songs written by Albert Hammond
Songs written by Mike Hazlewood
1990s ballads
Grunge songs
Songs involved in plagiarism controversies
Alternative rock ballads
Songs about loneliness